The Detroit Electric was an electric car produced by the Anderson Electric Car Company in Detroit, Michigan. The company built 13,000 electric cars from 1907 to 1939.

The marque was revived in 2008 by Albert Lam, former Group CEO of the Lotus Engineering Group and executive director of Lotus Cars of England. to produce modern all-electric cars by Detroit Electric Holding Ltd. of the Netherlands.

History

Anderson had previously been known as the Anderson Carriage Company (until 1911), producing carriages and buggies since 1884. Production of the electric automobile, powered by a rechargeable lead acid battery, began in 1907. For an additional , an Edison nickel-iron battery was available from 1911 to 1916. The cars were advertised as reliably getting  between battery recharging, although in one test a Detroit Electric ran  on a single charge. Today, the rare few examples in running condition that are still privately owned can have difficulty being licensed in some countries due to their very low speed. Today, due to time taking a toll on the efficiency of the engines, and due to having to use batteries that are not as powerful or efficient as the original batteries, as modern car batteries are not intended for continued output, many are only able to achieve their advertised top speed downhill, or with favorable winds. Cars in running condition only are operated uncommonly, and for short distances. Running cars weigh more than they were built to, because owners will install roughly 14 car batteries, and a balancing charger, rather than the original batteries that weighed much less. Cars today must have their battery sets changed relatively frequently. For example, a private owner who is only the 3rd owner of his car, has changed batteries 3 times since purchasing his vehicle in 1988.

The Detroit Electric was mainly sold to women drivers and physicians who desired the dependable and immediate start without the physically demanding hand cranking of the engine that was required with early internal combustion engine autos. A statement of the car's refinement was subtly made to the public through its design which included the first use of curved window glass in a production automobile, an expensive and complex feature to produce.

The company production was at its peak in the 1910s selling around 1000 to 2000 cars a year. Towards the end of the decade, the Electric was helped by the high price of gasoline during World War I. In 1920, the name of the Anderson company was changed to "The Detroit Electric Car Company" as the car maker separated from the body business (it became part of Murray Body) and the motor/controller business (Elwell-Parker).

As improved internal combustion engine automobiles became more common and inexpensive, sales of the Electric dropped in the 1920s, but the company stayed in business producing Detroit Electrics until after the stock market crash of 1929. The company filed for bankruptcy, but was acquired and kept in business on a more limited scale for some years, building cars in response to special orders. The last Detroit Electric was shipped on February 23, 1939, (though they were still available until 1942), but in its final years the cars were manufactured only in very small numbers. Between 1907 and 1939 a total of 13,000 electric cars were built.

Notable people who owned Detroit Electrics cars included Thomas Edison, Lizzie Borden, Charles Proteus Steinmetz, Mamie Eisenhower, and John D. Rockefeller, Jr. who had a pair of Model 46 roadsters. Clara Ford, the wife of Henry Ford, drove Detroit Electrics from 1908, when Henry bought her a Model C coupe with a special child seat, through the late teens. Her third car was a 1914 Model 47 brougham.

Genzo Shimazu, founder of the Japanese battery company Japan Storage Battery Co. (known today as GS Yuasa), imported two Detroit Electric cars shortly after starting the company in 1917. Using his own batteries, he drove them around Tokyo to demonstrate the effectiveness of battery technology. Shimazu used them as daily drivers for 29 years until his retirement in 1946. With a return of interest in electric vehicles at the beginning of the 21st century, GS Yuasa restored one of the vehicles to running condition with a modern lithium-ion 24-volt battery in 2009, registering the date, May 20, as Electric Car Day in Japan.

Detroit Electrics can be seen in various automobile museums, such as the Forney Transport Museum in Denver Colorado, Belgian AutoWorld Museum in Brussels, The Henry Ford in Dearborn, Michigan and the Museum Autovision in Altlußheim, Germany. A restored and operational Detroit Electric, owned by Union College, is located in the Edison Tech Center in Schenectady, NY. Another restored and operational 1914 with the Edison battery option (Nickel-Iron vs. Lead Acid) is located at the National Automobile Museum in Reno Nevada. One 1914 model Is also located, restored and fully operational, near Frankenmuth, Michigan and another is at the Motor Museum of Western Australia in Perth Australia, a 1914 Brougham in excellent condition.

In popular culture
The Disney cartoon character Grandma Duck drives a red car with license plate number "1902" that appears similar to a Detroit Electric.
A Detroit Electric is featured in the Perry Mason episode The Case of the Borrowed Baby (season 5, episode 26, broadcast date April 14, 1962).
The Detroit Electric Car Company is featured in D.E. Johnson's crime novel The Detroit Electric Scheme published in September, 2010.

Revival

See also
History of the electric vehicle

References

External links 

 1916 Detroit Electric Touring Car short article and photograph
 Detroit Electric car at Forney Museum article with photos of a 1916 Detroit Electric Opera Coupe
 photo of 1931 model Detroit Electric
 Autovision (Museum) German Museum with a number of electric cars (e.g., a Detroit Electric)
 1922 Detroit Electric Coupe at The Henry Ford
 1914 Detroit Electric Model 47 Brougham at The Henry Ford

Electric vehicles introduced in the 20th century
Vintage vehicles
Defunct manufacturing companies based in Detroit
Electric vehicle manufacturers of the United States